Nonnus (Nónnos) usually refers to Nonnus of Panopolis, a Hellenized Egyptian who wrote the longest-surviving epic poem from antiquity, the Dionysiaca.

Nonnus may also refer to:

 Nonnus (wasp), a genus of wasps
 St Nonnus, a probably legendary Syrian bishop from the hagiography of St Pelagia
 Nonnus of Edessa, bishop, frequently but probably mistakenly conflated with St Nonnus and with Nonnus of Panopolis
 Nonnus of Zerabenna, bishop
 Nonnus (historian) (6th-century), better known as Nonnosus
 Theophanes Nonnus, a 10th-century Byzantine physician
 Pseudo-Nonnus also called Nonnus Abbas (i.e. "Nonnus the Abbot"), a 6th-century AD commentator on Gregory Nazianzen

See also
 Nonus
 Nonius
 Nonnosus